Scytothamnales is an order of brown algae (class Phaeophyceae).

References

 
Brown algae orders